Etienne Schmidt (born 21 September 1950) is a South African cricketer. He played in 55 first-class and 19 List A matches between 1970/71 and 1984/85.

See also
 List of Eastern Province representative cricketers

References

External links
 

1950 births
Living people
South African cricketers
Eastern Province cricketers
Free State cricketers
Cricketers from Bloemfontein